The EMD SD40 is an American 6-axle diesel-electric locomotive built by General Motors Electro-Motive Division between January 1966 and August 1972. 1,268 locomotives were built between 1966 and 1972. In 1972, an improved version with new electronics was developed and marketed as a new locomotive, the SD40-2.

Design
Like its predecessor in EMD's catalog, the SD35, the SD40 is a high-horsepower, six-axle freight locomotive. The SD40 is a member of EMD's long-running Special Duty class of locomotives, which all are built with 6 axles.

In 1966, EMD updated its locomotive catalog with entirely new models, all powered by the new 645 diesel engine. These included six-axle models SD38, SD40, SDP40 and SD45. All shared standardized components, including the frame, cab, generator, trucks, traction motors, and air brakes. The primary difference was the power output: SD38 =  from a non-turbocharged V16, SD40 =  from a turbocharged V16, and SD45 =  from a turbocharged V20.

Original owners
856 examples of this locomotive model were built for American railroads, 330 were built for Canadian railroads, 72 were built for Mexican railroads, 6 were built for the Guinea-Boke Project, and 4 SD40Ms riding on  gauge trucks were exported to Brazil. They were manufactured at McCook, Illinois.

Built by GMD at London, Ontario

Mexican SD40's Built by EMD at McCook, Illinois or GMD at London, Ontario

Phases are as listed by Robert Sarberenyi.

Derivatives and Experimental

The very first test bed SD40, EMD 434, constructed on an SD35 frame in July 1964 was in active service until retired by Canadian National Railway in March 2009 and donated to the Monticello Railway Museum in July 2009, albeit having been upgraded to an "SD40-2R", as Illinois Central 6071.

18 customized SD40s were built for the Illinois Central Railroad as model SD40A, using the longer SDP45 frame, which allowed for a larger 5,000 gallon fuel tank.

Versions of the SD40 modified for the Australian loading gauge were sold to WAGR and Victorian Railways as their L and C classes respectively.

The SD40 was succeeded by an upgraded Dash 2 version called the SD40-2.

SD40 rebuilds 
After having been succeeded by the more modern SD40-2, a large number of SD40 have been upgraded with more modern equipment. The main difference between rebuilt SD40 and genuine SD40-2 is that the latter use a longer frame and has longer front and rear porches, while the rebuilt SD40 have a shorter frame.

A common product of rebuilding SD40s, and sometimes SD40-2s, is an SD40-3. The major addition denotes that the rebuilt unit or units as an SD40-3 is the addition of a micro-processor, and sometimes other modern components. The usual reasons for installing a micro-processor are improved traction control, and better fuel economy (via better injection control). Also, electronic control over braking systems (independent and automatic). This may include some SD39, SD45 and SD45-2 rebuilt to SD40-2 standards.

The SD40R is a rebuilt of all the Southern Pacific's SD40 between 1980 and 1981.

30 SD40 units have been rebuilt as SD40M-2 by Morrison Knudsen for Southern Pacific, alongside 97 SD45s and 6 SDP45s.

The SD40-2XR designates 15 SD40 and a SDP40 rebuilt to Dash-2 standards for Montana Rail Link.

The SD40E is an SD50 rebuilt by the Norfolk Southern Railway and derated to 3000 HP (equivalent to an SD40-2).

SD40-series production timeline

Preservation 
Santa Fe #5008 (built 1966 as ATSF 1708) is preserved at the Walt Disney Hometown Museum in Marceline, Missouri.

The cab of former NS #1594 (rebuilt to RPU6 #880) is preserved at the Museum of Transportation in Roanoke, VA.

Canadian Pacific SD40 #5500 is preserved at the Revelstoke Railway Museum in Revelstoke, BC. It was CP's first SD40, built in 1966 at GMD's London plant and was retired in 2001. The unit was donated to the museum in 2007. Plans are being made to restore the locomotive to its original look as it was when ordered, including a repaint into its original grey/tuscan red paint scheme, known as the Canadian Pacific "Script".

Ex-Canadian National SD40 #5232 (built November 1971) has been purchased by The Vintage Locomotive Society on January 10, 2015, from Cando and the Central Manitoba Railway. It is being used for revenue service by Prairie Rail Solutions, a wholly owned subsidiary of the Society. The unit has been repainted completely black, with Prairie Rail Solutions lettering and logos. It is VLSX 5232.

Illinois Central SD40-2R #6071, the first SD40 built, is preserved at the Monticello Railway Museum in Monticello, Illinois. It was originally EMD demonstrator #434. It was sold to the Gulf Mobile & Ohio and it became GM&O #950. The GM&O was later merged into the Illinois Central Railroad and became Illinois Central Gulf #6071, then later rebuilt into an SD40-2R for the IC. It was donated March 11, 2009. The engine is fully functional, however it needs new traction motors if it were to operate again.

Chesapeake and Ohio 7534 has been donated by CSX Transportation to the C&O Historical Society in Clifton Forge, Virginia. This engine is well known in the railroad enthusiast community as it ran on CSX right up to the late-2000s still wearing some of it original C&O paint and lettering, and was the very last SD40 on CSX's roster. The engine was meant to be used on the Buckingham Branch Railroad, which also operates out of Clifton Forge, however the unit spends quite a bit of time at the Historical Society's museum.

In mid December, 2014, it was revealed that Norfolk Southern had set aside two SD40 units, that were retired in 2007, for preservation:
NS SD40 #1580, built as Norfolk and Western #1580, the first SD40 built for the N&W. It is currently being stored at the Juniata Shops in Altoona.
NS SD40 #3170, built as Southern #3170, the first SD40 bought by the Southern. It was restored to operating condition at the Juniata Shops in Altoona, Pennsylvania, and then sent to the NS Paint shops at the Debutts Yard in Chattanooga, Tennessee, where it made its public debut February 27, 2015. It operated on the NS Coastal Division. On May 18, 2016, it was donated to the Tennessee Valley Railroad Museum by Norfolk Southern.

See also 
List of GM-EMD locomotives
List of GMD Locomotives

References

 
 Sarberenyi, Robert. EMD SD40, SD40A, and SDP40 Original Owners. Retrieved on December 19, 2009
 Eck, H. C., The Modern Locomotive Handbook, 1977
 Service Department (1966). SD40 - SDP40 Operator's Manual. La Grange, IL: Electro-Motive Division of General Motors Corporation

SD40
C-C locomotives
Diesel-electric locomotives of the United States
Railway locomotives introduced in 1966
Articles which contain graphical timelines
Freight locomotives
Standard gauge locomotives of the United States
Standard gauge locomotives of Canada
Standard gauge locomotives of Mexico
5 ft 3 in gauge locomotives
Diesel-electric locomotives of Canada
Diesel-electric locomotives of Mexico